Yuriy Viktorovych Volotovskyi (7 November 1982) is a Ukrainian theater and cinema actor, and Master of Sports in Powerlifting.

Biography 
Volotovsky's father is a forest warden and his mother is a kindergarten teacher. Yuriy was a skinny kid and hoping to overcome his defects one day he decided to go for sport.

He started with running, ice hockey, skiing, and martial arts but when he got into a gym for the first time he quickly realized that was exactly what he was looking for. In 2000 he graduated from school and entered the National Technical University of Ukraine Kyiv Polytechnic Institute NTUU "KPI", faculty of physical education and sport, and specialized in powerlift coaching.

Being a student he was coached by Viktoria Posmitna, the strongest woman in Ukraine. In 2005, graduated from the Institute. In 2007, Yuriy started his own gym named "Yuria" in his hometown of Shpitky.

Thanks to the steel he loved so much and the popularity of movies starring extremely fit actors, Yuriy developed a burning desire to work as an actor. In 2008 he took model and photo model classes in Models College ruled by the "Oleg & Eve" agency. The classes included studying acting technique.

Sport career

Participation in competitions

Awards and titles 
Master of Sport of Ukraine in powerlifting — Yuriy received many awards for his contribution to the development of physical education and sport.

Creative activity 

Theater roles
2009 Folk Amateur Theater:
 Easter's Eve play — Kayapha's servant;
 Vertep — King Irod's warrior;
2010-2011 Theater of Alive Sculpture:
 Ukrainian Fashion Week, Viktoriya Gres — statue;
 Opening event of «Oscar» Cinema — Oscar statue;
 Pharaoh statue;
 Travel Agency Award — white statue.

Cinema roles

Movie and TV shows 

2008
 Kvartal-95 project on Inter TV channel «Novogodniy ogonek» (New Year's Eve party) 2008 — Rodin statue, image of a Bogatyr — 33 Bogatyria, image of a Spartan warrior — 300 Spartans.
 TV channel inter project — «Ranok iz Interom» (Morning with Inter), self-defense heading.
2009
 «Vozvraschenie Mukhtara» (Mukhtar comes back) — fifth season, episode «King's pawn».
2010
 TV channel 1+1 project, show «Simeyni Dramy» (Family drama), episode «Gigolo» (Alphonce), as fitness centre manager.
 TV channel STB along with KVN team 4P Minsk shooting comic show «Smeshnie Ludy» (Funny people).
2012
 «Taksi» (Taxi) — episode 63 «Revnost» (Jealousy)
 TV channel show «SHury-amury»

Music video 
2009
 Myata — "Ya zadikhaus" (I'm suffocating)

Advertising video 
2007
 "Antral"
2009
 TM Skvortsovo "Kolbasnyi Kray"
2010
 Old Slavonic Complex "Yarilo" — Ivana Kupala Day
 Hotel complex "Perekrestok"
 Euro windows "KBE"

Computer games/software 
2011
 SOSISKA.RU — sausage tug-of-war
 Apple Inc. — working name "fitness instructor"

References 

1982 births
Living people
21st-century Ukrainian male actors
Ukrainian male weightlifters
Ukrainian male models
Ukrainian male film actors
Ukrainian male stage actors
Ukrainian male television actors